Chris Cosh (born May 12, 1959) is an American football coach and former player. He currently serves as the defensive coordinator at Hampton University.

Playing career
Cosh played linebacker for the Virginia Tech Hokies from 1977 to 1981.

Coaching career
He has been a defensive coach since he started as a student assistant at Virginia Tech in 1983.  Cosh has moved around a lot, with 13 stops in 25 years, including two with the Maryland Terrapins (1997, 2006–2008) and re-joining Holtz with the South Carolina Gamecocks (1999–2003).

He served as linebackers coach in 2004 and 2005 for the Kansas State Wildcats under head coach Bill Snyder, before returning to Maryland as their defensive coordinator and linebackers coach with head coach Ralph Friedgen.

While at Maryland, Cosh was frequently criticized by fans for the inconsistent performance by Maryland's defense, which was described as "poor to occasionally impressive".  Friedgen praised Cosh's recruiting but showed public frustration with Cosh's in-game coaching.

On December 6, 2008 it was announced that Cosh would return to Kansas State for a second time under coach Snyder (when Snyder decided to come out of retirement to help the Wildcats) as assistant head coach (to Snyder) and co-defensive coordinator alongside Vic Koenning.

Cosh will have now served as a defensive coordinator in five of the six BCS conferences (Big Ten, SEC, ACC, Big 12, and Big East).

On January 18, 2012, Cosh was announced as the new defensive coordinator at the University of South Florida.

On February 4, 2016, Cosh was named defensive coordinator at the University of Richmond. He followed head coach Danny Rocco to the University of Delaware as the defensive coordinator and defensive backs coach on January 5, 2017.

On July 21, 2021, Cosh was named defensive coordinator at Christopher Newport University.
2022 Hampton University defensive coordinator.

Personal
Cosh is a native of Washington, D.C., and graduated from Bishop McNamara High School in Forestville, Maryland. He has a bachelor's degree in physical education from Virginia Tech in 1983.

Cosh and his wife, Mary, live in Maryland. They have two sons, J. J., who was a member of the Midshipmen football team at the United States Naval Academy from 2007-2011. He is currently a scout for the Chicago Bears. Their other son, Billy, played at Kansas State University as a freshman before transferring to Butler Community College and later to University of Houston, where he graduated in 2014. Billy is currently the offensive coordinator at Western Michigan University.

References

External links
 Delaware profile
 Richmond profile
 North Texas profile

1959 births
Living people
Buffalo Bulls football coaches
Delaware Fightin' Blue Hens football coaches
Illinois Fighting Illini football coaches
Kansas State Wildcats football coaches
Maryland Terrapins football coaches
Michigan State Spartans football coaches
Minnesota Golden Gophers football coaches
North Texas Mean Green football coaches
Richmond Spiders football coaches
South Carolina Gamecocks football coaches
South Florida Bulls football coaches
Southeast Missouri State Redhawks football coaches
UNLV Rebels football coaches
Virginia Tech Hokies football coaches
Virginia Tech Hokies football players
Wisconsin–Oshkosh Titans football coaches
People from Forestville, Maryland
Players of American football from Maryland
Players of American football from Washington, D.C.